Solex vs. the Hitmeister is the debut studio album by Dutch musician Solex. It was released on 10 March 1998 by Matador Records.

Critical reception

Heather Phares of AllMusic wrote, "A completely unique combination of beats, samples, and voice, Solex is insular and inventive, revealing an artist with a very personal kind of creativity." David Browne of Entertainment Weekly said, "The echoey, rattling, wind-tunnel music lends an even eerier power to her tales of obsessions both romantic and physical."

In 2015, Fact placed Solex vs. the Hitmeister at number 28 on its list of the best trip hop albums of all time.

Track listing

Personnel
Credits are adapted from the album's liner notes.

 Solex (Elisabeth Esselink) – performance, production, mixing, sleeve design
 Gerard Atema – clarinet
 Geert de Groot – guitar, piano, cello, bass guitar, melodica
 Frans Hagenaars – production, engineering, mixing
 Flip Heurckmans – engineering (assistant)
 Jeroen Kramer – saxophone, clarinet
 Robert Lagendijk – drums, vocals
 Colette Sloots – graphic editing

References

External links
 

1998 debut albums
Solex (musician) albums
Albums recorded in a home studio
Matador Records albums
Experimental pop albums
Trip hop albums
Sound collage albums